Vittorio Blanseri ( 1735–1775) (or Blancheri) was an Italian painter, born at Venice. He trained with the Cavalière Claudio Beaumont, and succeeded him in the service of the court of Turin. He painted a  St Louis fainting, supported by an angel for the church of San Pelagio.

References

1735 births
1775 deaths
18th-century Italian painters
Italian male painters
Painters from Venice
Painters from Turin
18th-century Italian male artists